Adam Nagy (born August 29, 1993)  is a Slovak professional ice hockey goaltender. He is currently a free agent.

Career statistics

Regular season and playoffs

References

External links

 

Living people
HK Dukla Trenčín players
HK 91 Senica players
HK 95 Panthers Považská Bystrica players
HC '05 Banská Bystrica players
ŠHK 37 Piešťany players
HC 07 Detva players
MHk 32 Liptovský Mikuláš players
Peliitat Heinola players
HK Nitra players
1993 births
Slovak ice hockey goaltenders
People from Levice
Sportspeople from the Nitra Region
Slovak expatriate ice hockey players in Finland